European Superleague is a football sports management game released for the Amiga, Amstrad CPC 6128, Atari ST, IBM PC compatibles, and ZX Spectrum 128/+3 platforms. It was created by Matrix Developments and published in 1990 by CDS Microsystems.

Gameplay 
Up to eight players can manage one European team on one of three difficulty levels. The player's responsibilities are training, scouting, transfers, press speeches and team strategy.

Each team has 20 players with different skill that change throughout the season, so the player has to select the starter eleven for every match.

References

External links 
 European Superleague at gamerwiki.com
 European Superleague at cpcgamereviews.com
 Spectrum cover of the Spanish version

1990 video games
Amiga games
Amstrad CPC games
Association football management video games
Atari ST games
DOS games
Europe-exclusive video games
ZX Spectrum games
Multiplayer and single-player video games
Video games developed in the United Kingdom